The 2021–22 Bethune–Cookman Wildcats men's basketball team represented Bethune–Cookman University in the 2021–22 NCAA Division I men's basketball season. The Wildcats, led by first-year head coach Reggie Theus, played their home games at Moore Gymnasium in Daytona Beach, Florida as members of the Southwestern Athletic Conference.

On July 1, 2021, the Wildcats officially joined the SWAC after being a member of the Mid-Eastern Athletic Conference since 1979.

Previous season
The Wildcats did not participate in the 2020–21 NCAA Division I men's basketball season due to the ongoing COVID-19 pandemic. 

Head coach Ryan Ridder left the Wildcats to become the head coach at UT−Martin on March 30, 2021. Theus was named head coach and athletic director at Bethune−Cookman in July 2021

Roster

Schedule and results

|-
!colspan=12 style=| Regular season

|-

Source

References

Bethune–Cookman Wildcats men's basketball seasons
Bethune-Cookman Wildcats
Bethune-Cookman Wildcats men's basketball
Bethune-Cookman Wildcats men's basketball